The Sobański Palace is a Renaissance Revival palace in Guzów, Żyrardów County, Mazovian Voivodeship, Poland.

History

18th century
The ducal domain of Guzów goes back to the Late Middle Ages and its owner, Siemowit IV, Duke of Masovia. In the second half of the 18th-century, a fortuitous marriage to Paula, née Szembek, widow of Jan Prosper Potocki, enabled nobleman Andrzej Ogiński to receive the estate in her dowry. They were the parents of a daughter and of noted composer Michał Kleofas Ogiński. Andrzej Ogiński built a brick manorial complex in Late baroque style on the Guzów site.

After the third partition of Poland it became the property of the Prussian state, but handed to minister, baron Karl Georg von Hoym for his services. He in turn decided to sell it back to its erstwhile owner, the widow Ogińska, when her first-born son, Feliks Lubienski stepped in with the offer of his two estates in exchange for Guzów. It was accepted. He and his immediate family owned the estate till the 1840s. In 1842 Henryk Lubienski got into severe financial difficulties that resulted in the estate being auctioned off in 1856 to recover debts.

19th century

It was rescued by a grandson of Feliks Łubieński, Feliks Sobański from Podolia, who bought the estate for a considerable sum, wiping out the debts. In the last quarter of the nineteenth century, Sobański commissioned architect Władysław Hirszel to rebuild the manor house as a grand palace, modelling it on French Loire Valley castles. A landscaped garden was designed by Walerian Kronenberg and Franciszek Szanior.

20th century
During the First World War the palace was used as a front line hospital, and was virtually destroyed, along with its garden. During the interwar period, it was rebuilt, but after the Second World War the palace was looted for its decorations and furnishings. Later, the palace was used as accommodation for the local sugar factory's employees. In 1996, the Sobański family regained possession of the palace complex.

After many years of dereliction, the house is now being restored from its poor condition, along with the garden. The old palace chapel (now the Church of St Felix de Valois), together with a section of the garden, is the only part of the property that has been fully restored.

Gallery

References

Bibliography 

 Sylwester Rudnik, Historia guzowskiej rezydencji, w: Spotkania z zabytkami 6/2004
 Katalog zabytków sztuki w Polsce. Tom X. Powiat grodzisko-mazowiecki, ISPAN, Warszawa 1967

External links 
 http://palacwguzowie.pl Pałac Sobańskich w Guzowie - official palace website 
 http://podrozniccy.com/en/poland/palace-guzow

Sobański family
Palaces in Poland